The Governor of Gujarat is a nominal head and representative of the President of india in the state of Gujarat. The governor is appointed by the president for a term of five years and resides in Raj Bhavan in Gandhinagar. Acharya Devvrat took charge as the governor on 22 July 2019.

Powers and functions

The governor enjoys many different types of powers:

Executive powers related to administration, appointments and removals,
Legislative powers related to lawmaking and the state legislature, that is Vidhan Sabha or Vidhan Parishad, and
Discretionary powers to be carried out according to the discretion of the governor.

Governors of Gujarat

References

Gujurat
 
Governors